Chenderoh Power Station or Chenderoh Dam is one of the oldest and the first major hydroelectric dam and power station in Malaysia. It was preceded by two earlier booiis
 using Malaya's rivers; the Ulu Gombak station of 800kw in Selangor, completed in 1905 and that was used to provide Kuala Lumpur's first electric supply, and the Sungei Besi Tin Mines Ltd scheme at Ulu Langat that was purchased by the FMS Electrical Department in 1929. The dam is located in Chenderoh Lake, Kuala Kangsar District, Perak. It was constructed starting in 1927 by the Perak River Hydro-Electric Power Company Ltd  and was completed between 1929 and 1930. Detailed descriptions of the scheme appear in the Minutes of the Institute of Civil Engineers, London, Volume 239, Issue 1935, 1935, pp. 253-312 and in the Architectural Review, Volume 75, No. 446, London, January 1934. The scheme was designed by the consulting engineers Rendel, Palmer & Tritton of London and Vattenbyggnadsbyran (VBB) of Stockholm, Sweden. The architect was Osvald Almqvist. 

The Chenderoh plant was constructed in tandem with a steam power station at Malim Nawar, some 65km south of Chenderoh, that was commissioned in 1928. Between them the stations were designed to supply electrical power to the Kinta Valley's tin mining industry and associated settlements.

Power station
The power station is a hydroelectric power station, using 4 turbines of 10.7 MW and one of 8.4 MW, totaling 40.5 MW installed capacity. The station is operated by Tenaga Nasional.

Chenderoh Dam technical specifications

The permanent dam components are as follows:
Main Dam
Power Intake Structure - 5 bays.
Spillway- gated concrete weir with chute and flip bucket.
Power Tunnels - 5 tunnels.
Powerhouse 
powerhouse
with 5 penstocks to powertrains comprising 5 turbines of 10.7MW each and one of 8.4 MW, 5 generators of 15MVA each and 4 transformers of 15MVA each.

Notable facts
Chenderoh Dam is the oldest hydroelectric dam in Malaya.

See also

Tenaga Nasional

References

External links
Tnb webpage

Hydroelectric power stations in Malaysia
Dams in Malaysia